James W. Clay, Jr. is a former Democratic member of the Pennsylvania House of Representatives, who represented the 179th legislative district from 2013 to 2014. He was elected in 2012 after his predecessor, Tony Payton, was removed from the ballot due to a failure to collect the proper number of signature, leaving him as the only candidate remaining.

Mr. Clay frequently goes by the nickname "Scoot" in his personal life. He is a graduate of Frankford High School.

External links

Democratic Party members of the Pennsylvania House of Representatives
Living people
African-American state legislators in Pennsylvania
Politicians from Philadelphia
Year of birth missing (living people)
21st-century African-American people